al-Amīn al-Hajj Mustafa an-Nakīr is a Moroccan chef specializing in barbecue. He worked as the chef of the former King of Morocco Hassan II, inheriting the position of palace chef from his forefathers. He specializes in and is famous for meshwi lamb and the traditional Marrakshi dish called tangia.

He has a restaurant in Marrakesh called 'end l-amīn ( lit.

See also 

 Moroccan cuisine
 Cristeta Comerford

References 

People from Marrakesh
Moroccan chefs